Rubiano is one of 28 parishes (administrative divisions) in the municipality of Grado, within the province and autonomous community of Asturias, in northern Spain. 

The population is 26 (INE 2007).

Villages and hamlets
La Calea
Entre el Valle (Entelvalle)
Las Cortes
El Regueral (El Reglal)
Rubiano
Trillapeña (Triapeña)
La Morada

References

Parishes in Grado